This is a list of Oceanian islands by area. No Indonesian islands outside the provinces of Western New Guinea or any other island of the Malay Archipelago are included. For comparison, Australia is also shown.

List of islands

Islands  and greater

Islands 
NB. Some islands of Australia and Western Papua (Indonesia) may be missing from this list.

See also 

 List of countries and dependencies by area
 List of islands (by continent and country)
 List of islands by highest point
 List of islands by name
 List of islands by population
 List of islands by population density
 List of countries by largest island

Notes

Footnotes

References
 
 

Islands
Oceania
Oceania